Pithanus is a genus of plant bugs in the family Miridae. There are at least three described species in Pithanus.

Species
These three species belong to the genus Pithanus:
 Pithanus hrabei Stehlik, 1952
 Pithanus maerkelii (Herrich-schaeffer, 1838)
 Pithanus marshalli Douglas & Scott, 1868

References

Further reading

External links

 

Miridae genera
Articles created by Qbugbot
Stenodemini